Walter Georg Pichler (born 23 October 1959) is a former German biathlete from Bad Reichenhall, who represented West Germany. At the 1984 Winter Olympics in Sarajevo, Pichler won a bronze medal with the West German relay team consisting of Peter Angerer, Ernst Reiter and Fritz Fischer.

Walter Pichler is the cousin of biathlon coach Wolfgang Pichler. He served as coach of the United States national biathlon team from 1989. He was appointed as head coach of the British biathlon team in May 2008.

References

German male biathletes
1959 births
Biathletes at the 1984 Winter Olympics
Living people
Olympic medalists in biathlon
Olympic biathletes of West Germany
Olympic bronze medalists for West Germany
Biathlon World Championships medalists
Medalists at the 1984 Winter Olympics
German cross-country skiing coaches
People from Bad Reichenhall
Sportspeople from Upper Bavaria